The Soapstone Formation is a geologic formation in Utah. It preserves fossils dating back to the Carboniferous period.

See also

 List of fossiliferous stratigraphic units in Utah
 Paleontology in Utah

References
 

Carboniferous geology of Utah